Acerrae (ancient Greek: Ἀχέρραι) was the ancient Roman name for three towns or cities:
 Acerrae (Campania), today's Acerra, some thirteen miles north-east of Naples
 Acerrae (Cisalpine Gaul), in today's Lombardy
 Acerrae Vatriae, said by Pliny to have been in Umbria